The women's 3000 metres at the 2012 World Junior Championships in Athletics will be held at the Estadi Olímpic Lluís Companys on 10 July.

Medalists

Records
, the existing world junior and championship records were as follows.

Results

Participation
According to an unofficial count, 19 athletes from 13 countries participated in the event.

References

External links
WJC12 3000 metres schedule

3000 metres
Long distance running at the World Athletics U20 Championships
2012 in women's athletics